Jocelyn Morlock (born 1969) is a Canadian composer and music educator based in Vancouver. Her piece My Name is Amanda Todd won the 2018 Juno Award for Classical Composition of the Year.

Early life and education
Morlock was born in Saint Boniface, Manitoba. She studied piano with Robert Richardson, Sr. and completed a Bachelor of Music in piano performance at Brandon University (B.Mus. 1994), where her teachers included Gerhard Ginader (electroacoustic music) and T. Patrick Carrabré (composition). She received both a master's degree and a Doctorate of Musical Arts from the University of British Columbia (M.Mus. 1996, DMA 2002) where her composition teachers included Stephen Chatman, Keith Hamel, and the late Russian-Canadian composer Nikolai Korndorf.

Career
Jocelyn Morlock was Composer-in-Residence with the Vancouver Symphony Orchestra (2014-2019), after completing her term (2012-2014) as inaugural Composer-in-Residence for Vancouver's Music on Main, co-host of ISCM World New Music Days 2017.

Morlock's international career was launched at the 1999 International Society for Contemporary Music's World Music Days with Romanian performances of her quartet Bird in the Tangled Sky, followed by Top 10 at the 2002 International Rostrum of Composers and Winner of the 2004 Canadian Music Centre Prairie Region Emerging Composers competition.

She has written the imposed work for several music competitions including the 2008 Eckhardt-Gramatté National Music Competition (Involuntary Love Songs) and the 2005 Montreal International Music Competition, (Amore.) She won the SOCAN Jan V. Matejcek New Classical Music Award in 2018.

Style

Morlock's music exhibits a quirky and eccentric post-modernism, but is specially centred on emotion. Her musical language is typically tonal or modal, but is expanded with extended techniques and colouristic effects.

Selected works
Bird in the Tangled Sky (1997)
Lacrimosa (2000)
Exaudi (2004)
 Music from the Romantic Era (2005)
Amore (2005)
half-light, somnolent rains (2005)
Cobalt (2009)
Aeromancy (2011) 
My Name is Amanda Todd (2016). It is a reflection on the life of Canadian Amanda Todd. It was commissioned and premiered by the National Arts Centre Orchestra as part of the multimedia symphonic work Life Reflected.  
Lucid Dreams (2017; cello concerto)

Discography 
Cobalt, Centrediscs CMCCD 20014 (2014)

Halcyon, Centrediscs CMCCD 23817 (2017)

Awards and nominations

JUNO Awards 
Classical Composition of the Year
 Won: My Name is Amanda Todd (2018)
 Nominated: Exaudi (2011)

Western Canadian Music Awards 
Classical Composer of the Year
 Won:  (2018)

Classical Composition of the Year

Won: Cobalt (2015)

Classical Recording of the Year
 Nominated: Cobalt (2015)

See also

2018 Juno Awards winners Juno Awards of 2018
 2011 Juno Awards nominees Juno Awards of 2011

References

External links
JocelynMorlock.com

1969 births
Canadian classical composers
Postmodern composers
Living people
Women classical composers
Juno Award for Classical Composition of the Year winners
Musicians from Winnipeg
People from Saint Boniface, Winnipeg
20th-century Canadian composers
21st-century classical composers
20th-century classical composers
20th-century women composers
21st-century women composers
Canadian women composers